The following American film actresses are listed alphabetically. It contains both actresses born American and those who acquired American nationality later.  

Some actors who are well known for both film and TV work are also included in the list of American television actresses.

Key to entries:
 born in Nation: this person was born abroad but was American by birth
 Nationality-born: this person acquired American citizenship later in life
 a range is birth–death years
 if year of death only is known, that is stated explicitly

A 

Beverly Aadland 1942–2010 
Mariann Aalda born  
Caroline Aaron born 
Diahnne Abbott born 
Rose Abdoo born 
Paula Abdul born 
Donzaleigh Abernathy born 
Whitney Able born 
Candice Accola born 
Amy Acker born 
Jean Acker 1893–1978
Bettye Ackerman 1924–2006
Amy Adams born  (born in Italy)
Brooke Adams born 
Edie Adams 1927–2008
Jane Adams born 
Joey Lauren Adams born 
Julie Adams 1926–2019
Lillian Adams 1922–2011
Mary Kay Adams born 
Nancy Addison 1946–2002
Shohreh Aghdashloo born  (Iranian-born)
Dianna Agron born 
Christina Aguilera born 
Lexi Ainsworth born 
Malin Åkerman born  (Swedish-born)
Jessica Alba born 
Lola Albright 1924–2017
Denise Alexander born 
Erika Alexander born 
Jaimie Alexander born 
Jane Alexander born 
Khandi Alexander born 
Sasha Alexander born 
Kristian Alfonso born 
Tatyana Ali born 
Mary Alice 1936–2022
Ana Alicia born  (born in Mexico)
Christa B. Allen born 
Debbie Allen born 
Elizabeth Allen 1929–2006
Joan Allen born 
Jonelle Allen born 
Karen Allen born 
Krista Allen born  or 1971
Laura Allen born 
Nancy Allen born 
Rosalind Allen born  (born in New Zealand)
Kirstie Alley 1951—2022
Jamie Anne Allman born 
June Allyson 1917–2006
Daniella Alonso born 
María Conchita Alonso born 
Trini Alvarado born 
Lauren Ambrose born 
Mädchen Amick born 
Suzy Amis born 
Eva Amurri born 
Kristina Anapau born 
Andrea Anders born 
Gillian Anderson born 
Loni Anderson born  or 1945
Mary Anderson, 1918–2014
Melody Anderson born 
Nicole Gale Anderson born 
Jennifer Aniston born 
Odette Annable born 
Susan Anton born 
Shiri Appleby born 
Christina Applegate born 
Anne Archer born 
Beverly Archer born 
Leila Arcieri born 
Eve Arden 1908–1990
Ashley Argota born 
Jillian Armenante born 
Bess Armstrong born 
Samaire Armstrong born  (born in Japan)
Alexis Arquette 1969–2016
Patricia Arquette born 
Rosanna Arquette born 
Bea Arthur 1922–2009
Jean Arthur 1900–1991
Katie Aselton born 
Ashanti born 
Elizabeth Ashley born 
Mary Astor 1906–1987
Margaret Avery born 
Awkwafina born 
Nicki Aycox 1975–2022
Rochelle Aytes born 
Candice Azzara born

B 

Lauren Bacall 1924–2014
Barbara Bach born  
Catherine Bach born 
Mary Badham born 
Jane Badler born 
Erykah Badu born 
Katherine Bailess born 
Laura Bailey 
Pearl Bailey 1918–1990
Barbara Bain born 
Fay Bainter 1893–1968
Diora Baird born 
Blanche Baker born 
Carroll Baker born 
Diane Baker born 
Kathy Baker born 
Leigh-Allyn Baker born 
Brenda Bakke born 
Fairuza Balk born 
Lucille Ball 1911–1989
Kaye Ballard 1925–2019
Talia Balsam born 
Anne Bancroft 1931–2005
Lisa Banes 1955-2021
Tallulah Bankhead 1902–1968
Elizabeth Banks born 
Tyra Banks born 
Theda Bara 1885–1955
Christine Baranski born 
Adrienne Barbeau born 
Ellen Barkin born 
Joanna Barnes 1934–2022
Priscilla Barnes born 
Majel Barrett 1932–2008
Barbara Barrie born 
Dana Barron born 
Drew Barrymore born 
Ethel Barrymore 1879–1959
Roseanne Barr born 
Bonnie Bartlett born 
Mischa Barton born 
Ella Jay Basco born 
Kim Basinger born 
Angela Bassett born 
Justine Bateman born 
Florence Bates 1888–1954
Kathy Bates born 
Cyia Batten born 
Frances Bavier 1902–1989
Barbara Baxley 1923-1990
Anne Baxter 1923–1985
Meredith Baxter born 
Jennifer Beals born 
Amanda Bearse born 
Madisen Beaty born 
Louise Beavers 1902–1962
Kimberly Beck born 
Bonnie Bedelia born 
Nicole Beharie born 
Beth Behrs born 
Doris Belack 1926–2011
Ashley Bell born 
Catherine Bell born 
Jillian Bell born 
Kristen Bell born 
Lake Bell born 
Camilla Belle born 
Kathleen Beller born 
Troian Bellisario born 
Maria Bello born 
Bea Benaderet 1906–1968
Andrea Bendewald born 
Annette Bening born 
Constance Bennett 1904–1965
Haley Bennett born 
Joan Bennett 1910–1990
Melissa Benoist born 
Amber Benson born 
Ashley Benson born 
Jodi Benson born 
Julie Benz born 
Candice Bergen born 
Polly Bergen 1930–2014
Elizabeth Berkley born 
Jeannie Berlin born 
Crystal Bernard born 
Sandra Bernhard born 
Halle Berry born 
Valerie Bertinelli born 
Angela Bettis born 
Troy Beyer born 
Mayim Bialik born 
Leslie Bibb born  or 1973
Jessica Biel born 
Barbara Billingsley 1915–2010
Rachel Bilson born  or 1982
Traci Bingham born 
Thora Birch born 
Kerry Bishé born 
Summer Bishil born 
Julie Bishop 1914–2001
Danielle Bisutti born 
Karen Black 1939–2013
Sofia Black-D'Elia born 
Joan Blackman born 
Betsy Blair 1923–2009
Linda Blair born 
Patricia Blair 1933–2013
Selma Blair born 
Amanda Blake 1929–1989
Susan Blakely born 
Ronee Blakley born 
Jolene Blalock born 
Rowan Blanchard born 
Tammy Blanchard born 
Sally Blane 1910–1997
Alexis Bledel born 
Yasmine Bleeth born 
Mary J. Blige born 
Joan Blondell 1906–1979
Nikki Blonsky born 
Moon Bloodgood born 
Lindsay Bloom born 
Verna Bloom 1938–2019
Emily Blunt born 
Ann Blyth born 
Eleanor Boardman 1898–1991
Mary Boland 1880–1965
Melissa Bolona born 
Beulah Bondi 1889–1981
Lisa Bonet born 
Shirley Booth 1898–1992
Olive Borden 1906–1947
Alex Borstein born 
Michelle Borth born 
Samantha Boscarino born 
Rachel Boston born 
Kate Bosworth born 
Barbara Bouchet born  or 1943  (born in Germany) 
Julie Bovasso 1930–1991
Clara Bow 1905–1965
Katrina Bowden born 
Lilan Bowden born 
Andrea Bowen born 
Julie Bowen born 
Jessica Bowman born 
Jenna Boyd born 
Anise Boyer 1914–2008
Lara Flynn Boyle born 
Lucy Boynton born 
Lorraine Bracco born 
Alice Brady 1892–1939
Alexandra Breckenridge born 
Tracey E. Bregman born  (born in Germany)
Lucille Bremer 1917–1996
Eileen Brennan 1932–2013
Amy Brenneman born 
Abigail Breslin born 
Jordana Brewster born 
Paget Brewster born 
Chloe Bridges born 
Alison Brie born 
Connie Britton born 
Pamela Britton 1923-1974
Beth Broderick born 
Jayne Brook born 
Geraldine Brooks 1925–1977
Louise Brooks 1906–1985
Blair Brown born  or 1947
Chelsea Brown 1942–2017
Kimberlin Brown born 
Kimberly J. Brown born 
Olivia Brown born 
Pat Crawford Brown 1925–2019
Vanessa Brown 1928–1999
Yvette Nicole Brown born 
Leslie Browne born 
Logan Browning born 
Sabrina Bryan born 
Joy Bryant born 
Nana Bryant born 
Tara Buck born 
Kira Buckland born 
Betty Buckley born 
Sandra Bullock born 
Cara Buono born 
Candace Cameron Bure born 
Billie Burke 1884–1970
Delta Burke born 
Marylouise Burke born 
Carol Burnett born 
Brooke Burns born 
Catherine Burns born 
Heather Burns born 
Ellen Burstyn born 
Hilarie Burton born 
Kate Burton born 
Sophia Bush born 
Brett Butler born 
Yancy Butler born 
Ruth Buzzi born 
Spring Byington 1886–1971
Amanda Bynes born 
Marion Byron 1911–1985

C 

Jeanne Cagney 1919–1984
Erin Cahill born 
L. Scott Caldwell born 
Alice Calhoun 1900–1966
Sarah Wayne Callies born 
Vanessa Bell Calloway born 
Anna Camp born 
Colleen Camp born 
Christa Campbell born 
Danielle Campbell born 
Maia Campbell born 
Tisha Campbell born 
Maria Canals-Barrera born 
Dyan Cannon born 
Lizzy Caplan born 
Jessica Capshaw born 
Kate Capshaw born 
Irene Cara 1959-2022
Gina Carano born 
Linda Cardellini born 
Clare Carey born 
Mariah Carey born 
Lynn Carlin born 
Kitty Carlisle 1910–2007
Amy Carlson born 
Kelly Carlson born 
Jeanne Carmen 1930–2007
Julie Carmen born 
Sue Carol 1906–1982
Charisma Carpenter born 
Jennifer Carpenter born 
Sabrina Carpenter born 
Ever Carradine born 
Barbara Carrera born  or 1944, or 1946, or 1951 (born in Nicaragua)
Tia Carrere born 
Diahann Carroll 1935–2019
Madeline Carroll born 
Nancy Carroll 1903–1965
Pat Carroll born 
Dixie Carter 1939–2010
Lynda Carter born 
Gabrielle Carteris born 
Angela Cartwright born  (English-born)
Veronica Cartwright born  (British-born)
Rosalind Cash 1938–1995
Peggy Cass 1924–1999
Joanna Cassidy born 
Katie Cassidy born 
Peggie Castle 1927–1973
Shanley Caswell born 
Phoebe Cates born 
Kim Cattrall born  (Canadian-born)
Jessica Cauffiel born 
Emma Caulfield born 
Joan Caulfield 1922–1991
Kristin Cavallari born 
Lacey Chabert born 
Faune Chambers born 
Carol Channing 1921–2019
Stockard Channing born 
Cyd Charisse 1922–2008
Annette Charles 1948–2011
Daveigh Chase born 
Jessica Chastain born 
Ruth Chatterton 1892–1961
Molly Cheek born 
Kristin Chenoweth born 
Cher born 
Vanessa Lee Chester born 
Lois Chiles born 
Anna Chlumsky born 
Margaret Cho born 
Rosalind Chao born 
Erika Christensen born 
Claudia Christian born 
Jamie Chung born 
Marguerite Churchill 1910–2000
Ciara born 
Candy Clark born 
Judy Clark 1924–2002
Melinda Clarke born 
Sarah Clarke born 
Patricia Clarkson born 
Jill Clayburgh 1944–2010
Kiersey Clemons born 
Colleen Clinkenbeard born 
Rosemary Clooney 1928–2002
Glenn Close born 
Imogene Coca 1908–2001
Annalisa Cochrane born 
Lauren Cohan born  (British-born)
Lynn Cohen 1933-2020
Mindy Cohn born 
Claudette Colbert 1903–1996
Taylor Cole born 
Tina Cole born 
Holliston Coleman born 
Monique Coleman born 
Kim Coles born 
Patricia Collinge 1892–1974
Lily Collins born  (British-American)
Lynn Collins born 
Holly Marie Combs born 
Anjanette Comer born 
Dorothy Comingore 1913–1971
Betty Compson 1897–1974
Michaela Conlin born 
Jennifer Connelly born 
Kristen Connolly born 
Carole Cook born 
Rachael Leigh Cook born 
Jennifer Coolidge born 
Ellen Corby 1911–1999
Mara Corday born 
Maddie Corman born 
Carrie Coon born 
Miranda Cosgrove born 
Dolores Costello 1903-1979
Stephanie Courtney born 
Jane Cowl 1883–1950
Courteney Cox born 
Laverne Cox born 
Nikki Cox born 
Yvonne Craig 1937–2015
Jeanne Crain 1925–2003
Barbara Crampton born 
Norma Crane 1928–1973
Joan Crawford  c. 1904–1977
Cathy Lee Crosby born 
Denise Crosby born 
Mary Crosby born 
Marcia Cross born 
Lindsay Crouse born 
Gia Crovatin born 
Suzanne Cryer born 
Constance Cummings 1910–2005
Erin Cummings born 
Quinn Cummings born 
Kaley Cuoco born 
Jane Curtin born 
Jamie Lee Curtis born 
Ann Cusack born 
Joan Cusack born 
Tawny Cypress born 
Miley Cyrus born

D 

Caroline D'Amore born 
Beverly D'Angelo born 
Patti D'Arbanville born 
Donna D'Errico born 
Shae D'lyn born 
Yaya DaCosta born 
Alexandra Daddario born 
Arlene Dahl 1925-2021
Irene Dailey 1920–2008
E. G. Daily born 
Nadia Dajani born 
Abby Dalton 1932–2020
Tyne Daly born 
Dorothy Dandridge 1922–1965
Claire Danes born 
Shera Danese born 
Brittany Daniel born 
Bebe Daniels 1901–1971
Erin Daniels born 
Sarah E. Daniels born 
Blythe Danner born 
Linda Darnell 1923–1965
Lisa Darr born 
Jane Darwell 1879–1967
Stacey Dash born 
Alexa Davalos born 
Amy Davidson born 
Ann B. Davis 1926–2014
Bette Davis 1908–1989
Dana Davis born 
Geena Davis born 
Hope Davis born 
Josie Davis born 
Kristin Davis born 
Phyllis Davis 1940–2013
Viola Davis born 
Embeth Davidtz born 
Pam Dawber born 
Rosario Dawson born 
Roxann Dawson born 
Doris Day 1922–2019
Felicia Day born 
Marceline Day 1908–2000
Priscilla Dean 1896–1987
Yvonne De Carlo 1922–2007
Brooklyn Decker born 
Frances Dee 1909–2004
Ruby Dee 1922–2014
Sandra Dee 1942–2005
Kaylee DeFer born 
Ellen DeGeneres born 
Gloria DeHaven 1925–2016
Olivia de Havilland 1916–2020
Nicole DeHuff 1975–2005
Wanda De Jesus born 
Paz de la Huerta born 
Allie DeBerry born 
Kate del Castillo born  (Mexican-born)
Kim Delaney born 
Diane Delano born 
Dana Delany born 
Idalis DeLeón born  or (1969)
Grey DeLisle born 
Julie Delpy born 
Drea de Matteo born 
Rebecca De Mornay born 
Carol Dempster 1901–1991
Lori Beth Denberg born 
Kat Dennings born 
Sandy Dennis 1937–1992
Bo Derek born 
Laura Dern born 
Portia de Rossi born 
Donna D'Errico born 
Melissa De Sousa born 
Emily Deschanel born 
Mary Jo Deschanel born 
Zooey Deschanel born 
Amanda Detmer born 
Madelyn Deutch born 
Zoey Deutch born 
Patti Deutsch 1943–2017
Kaitlyn Dever born 
Loretta Devine born 
Torrey DeVitto born 
Jenna Dewan born 
Joyce DeWitt born 
Rosemarie DeWitt born 
Noureen DeWulf born 
Susan Dey born 
Alyssa Diaz born 
Cameron Diaz born 
Melonie Diaz born 
Kim Dickens born 
Angie Dickinson born 
Marlene Dietrich 1901–1992
Victoria Dillard born 
Phyllis Diller 1917–2012
Melinda Dillon born 
Mia Dillon born 
Donna Dixon born 
Maria Dizzia born 
Ellen Drew 1915–2003
Megan Dodds born 
Shannen Doherty born 
Ami Dolenz born 
Dagmara Dominczyk born  (born in Poland)
Elinor Donahue born 
Jocelin Donahue born 
Elisa Donovan born 
Kaitlin Doubleday born 
Portia Doubleday born 
Donna Douglas 1932–2015
Illeana Douglas born 
Suzzanne Douglas 1957-2021
Fiona Dourif born 
Billie Dove 1903–1997
Ann Dowd born 
Doris Dowling 1923–2004
Denise Dowse born 
Polly Draper born 
Rachel Dratch born 
Fran Drescher born 
Louise Dresser 1878–1965
Marie Dressler 1868–1934
Minnie Driver  born 
Joanne Dru 1922–1996
Alice Drummond 1928–2016
Ja'Net DuBois 1932–2020
Heather Dubrow born 
Anne Dudek born 
Haylie Duff born 
Hilary Duff born 
Julia Duffy born 
Karen Duffy born 
Olympia Dukakis 1931–2021
Patty Duke 1946–2016
Faye Dunaway born 
Jennifer Dundas born 
Dominique Dunne 1959–1982
Irene Dunne 1898–1990
Mildred Dunnock 1901–1991
Kirsten Dunst born 
Tiffany Dupont born 
Eliza Dushku born 
Clea DuVall born 
Shelley Duvall born 
Ann Dvorak 1911–1979
Natalia Dyer born 
Alexis Dziena born

E 

Jeanne Eagels 1890–1929
Bobbie Eakes born 
Leslie Easterbrook born 
Alison Eastwood born 
Mary Eaton 1901–1948
Christine Ebersole born 
Sonya Eddy born 
Lisa Edelstein born 
Barbara Eden   
Melissa Claire Egan born 
Nicole Eggert born 
Jennifer Ehle born 
Lisa Eilbacher born  (born in Saudi Arabia)
Jill Eikenberry born 
Hallie Eisenberg born 
Carmen Electra born 
Erika Eleniak born 
Jenna Elfman born 
Kimberly Elise born 
Shannon Elizabeth born 
Vera-Ellen 1921–1981
Jane Elliot born 
Patricia Elliott 1938–2015
Aunjanue Ellis born 
Georgia Engel 1948–2019
Molly Ephraim born 
Shareeka Epps born 
Kathryn Erbe born 
Jennifer Esposito born 
Susie Essman born 
Scarlett Estevez born 
Estelle Evans 1906–1985
Judi Evans born 
Linda Evans born 
Madge Evans 1909–1981
Mary Beth Evans born 
Eve born 
Angie Everhart born 
Bridget Everett born 
Wynn Everett born 
Briana Evigan born 
Kayla Ewell born

F 

Shelley Fabares born 
Nanette Fabray 1920–2018
Morgan Fairchild born 
Lola Falana born 
Edie Falco born 
Siobhan Fallon born 
Dakota Fanning born 
Elle Fanning born 
Anna Faris born 
Frances Farmer 1913–1970
Vera Farmiga born 
Glenda Farrell 1904–1971
Sharon Farrell born 
Terry Farrell born 
Mia Farrow born 
Farrah Fawcett 1947–2009
Alice Faye 1915–1998
Barbara Feldon born 
Tovah Feldshuh born 
Beanie Feldstein born 
Sherilyn Fenn born 
Vanessa Ferlito born  or 1977/1976
Conchata Ferrell 1943–2020
America Ferrera born 
Peggy Feury 1924–1985
Tina Fey born 
Sally Field born 
Chip Fields born 
Holly Fields born 
Jere Fields born 
Kim Fields born 
Hala Finley born 
Ashley Fink born 
Linda Fiorentino born  or 1960
Jenna Fischer born 
Takayo Fischer born 
Danielle Fishel born 
Carrie Fisher 1956–2016
Frances Fisher born 
Joely Fisher born 
Schuyler Fisk born 
Fannie Flagg born 
Jennifer Flavin born 
Jaqueline Fleming born 
Rhonda Fleming 1923–2020
Louise Fletcher 1934-2022
Calista Flockhart born 
Ann Flood born 
Nina Foch 1924–2008
Megan Follows born  (born in Canada)
Bridget Fonda born 
Jane Fonda born 
Lyndsy Fonseca born 
Joan Fontaine 1917–2013 (born in Japan)
Anitra Ford born 
Constance Ford 1923–1993
Courtney Ford born 
Faith Ford born 
Maria Ford 1966
Deborah Foreman born 
Sally Forrest 1928–2015
Jodie Foster born 
Kimberly Foster born 
Meg Foster born 
Sara Foster born 
Sutton Foster born 
Jorja Fox born 
Megan Fox born 
Vivica A. Fox born 
Anne Francis 1930–2011
Kay Francis 1905–1968
Bonnie Franklin 1944–2013
Diane Franklin born 
Kathleen Freeman 1919–2001
Mona Freeman 1926–2014
Kate French born 
Lindsay Frost born 
Soleil Moon Frye born 
Isabelle Fuhrman born 
Emma Fuhrmann born 
Annette Funicello 1942–2013

G 

Eva Gabor 1919–1995 (Hungarian-born)
Zsa Zsa Gabor 1917–2016 (Hungarian-born)
Jacqueline Gadsden 1900–1986
Lady Gaga born 
Rita Gam 1927–2016
Aimee Garcia born 
Virginia Gardner born 
Ava Gardner 1922–1990
Beverly Garland 1926–2008
Judy Garland 1922–1969
Jennifer Garner born 
Julia Garner born 
Kelli Garner born 
Peggy Ann Garner 1932–1984
Janeane Garofalo born 
Teri Garr born  Or 1944
Betty Garrett 1919–2011
Greer Garson 1904–1996 (British-born)
Jennie Garth born 
Ana Gasteyer born 
Janina Gavankar born 
Erica Gavin born 
Rebecca Gayheart born 
Sami Gayle born 
Janet Gaynor 1906–1984
Mitzi Gaynor born 
Barbara Bel Geddes 1922–2005
Sarah Michelle Gellar born 
Gladys George 1904–1954
Lynda Day George born 
Melissa George born 
Lauren German born 
Gina Gershon born 
Jami Gertz born 
Greta Gerwig born 
Estelle Getty 1923–2008
Cynthia Gibb born 
Debbie Gibson born 
Kelli Giddish born 
Melissa Gilbert born 
Sara Gilbert born 
Sandra Giles 1932–2016
Elizabeth Gillies born 
Ann Gillis 1923–2018
Alexie Gilmore born 
Peri Gilpin born 
Annabeth Gish born 
Dorothy Gish 1898–1968
Lillian Gish 1893–1993
Robin Givens born 
Summer Glau born 
Lola Glaudini born 
Carlin Glynn born 
Paulette Goddard 1910–1990
Angela Goethals born 
Tracey Gold born 
Whoopi Goldberg born 
Gage Golightly born 
Arlene Golonka 1936-2021
Minna Gombell 1892–1973
Selena Gomez born 
Meagan Good born 
Ginnifer Goodwin born 
Lecy Goranson born 
Ruth Gordon 1896–1985
YaYa Gosselin born 
Alice Ghostley 1923–2007
Betty Grable 1916–1973
Maggie Grace born 
Heather Graham born 
Katerina Graham born  (Swiss-born)
Lauren Graham born 
Gloria Grahame 1923–1981
Greer Grammer born 
Ariana Grande born 
Beth Grant born 
Brea Grant born 
Lee Grant born 
Bonita Granville 1923–1988
Karen Grassle born 
Erin Gray born 
Linda Gray born 
Ari Graynor born 
Kathryn Grayson 1922–2010
Alice Greczyn born 
Kerri Green born 
Ashley Greene born 
Judy Greer born 
Kim Greist born 
Jennifer Grey born 
Virginia Grey 1917–2004
Pam Grier born 
Corinne Griffith 1894–1979
Melanie Griffith born 
Tracy Griffith born 
Leslie Grossman born 
Fiona Gubelmann born 
Carla Gugino born 
Ann Morgan Guilbert 1928–2016
Grace Gummer born 
Mamie Gummer born 
Anna Gunn born 
Danai Gurira born 
Jasmine Guy born 
Maggie Gyllenhaal born

H 

Olivia Hack born 
Shelley Hack born 
Joan Hackett 1934–1983
Martha Hackett born 
Tiffany Haddish born 
Julie Anne Haddock born 
Sara Haden 1899–1981
Marianne Hagan born 
Molly Hagan born 
Jean Hagen 1923–1977
Uta Hagen 1919–2004 (born in Germany)
Julie Hagerty born 
Meredith Hagner born 
Kathryn Hahn born 
Nikki Hahn born 
Stacy Haiduk born 
Leisha Hailey born  (born in Japan)
Barbara Hale 1922–2017
Jennifer Hale born  (born in Canada-American)
Lucy Hale born 
Alaina Reed Hall 1946–2009
Grayson Hall 1922–1985
Irma P. Hall born 
Rebecca Hall born 
Regina Hall born 
Florence Halop 1923–1986
Daria Halprin born 
Courtney Halverson born 
Veronica Hamel born 
Kim Hamilton 1932–2013
Linda Hamilton born 
LisaGay Hamilton born 
Lois Hamilton 1943–1999
Margaret Hamilton 1902–1985
Melinda Page Hamilton born 
Barbara Hancock born 
Chelsea Handler born 
Daryl Hannah born 
Anne Haney 1934–2001
Alyson Hannigan born 
Sammi Hanratty born 
Marcia Gay Harden born 
Melora Hardin born 
Ann Harding 1902–1981
Mariska Hargitay born 
Jean Harlow 1911–1937
Angie Harmon born 
Joy Harmon born 
Marie Harmon 1923–2021
Elisabeth Harnois born 
Jessica Harper born 
Tanisha Harper born 
Tess Harper born 
Valerie Harper 1939–2019
Laura Harring 1964 (Mexican-born)
Barbara Harris 1935-2018
Cynthia Harris 1934-2021
Danielle Harris born 
Danneel Harris born 
Estelle Harris 1928-2022
Harriet Sansom Harris born 
Julie Harris 1925–2013
Mel Harris born 
Rachael Harris born 
Jenilee Harrison born 
Linda Harrison born 
Kathryn Harrold born 
Deborah Harry born 
Margo Harshman born 
Dolores Hart born 
Melissa Joan Hart born 
Mariette Hartley born 
Elizabeth Hartman 1943–1987
Lisa Hartman Black born 
Teri Hatcher born 
Anne Hathaway born 
Marcia Haufrecht born 
Aaliyah Haughton 1979–2001
Wanda Hawley 1895–1963
Kali Hawk born 
Goldie Hawn born 
Salma Hayek born  (Mexican-born)
Allison Hayes 1930–1977
Helen Hayes 1900–1993
Susan Hayward 1917–1975
Rita Hayworth 1918–1987
Glenne Headly 1955–2017
Shari Headley born 
Amber Heard born 
Patricia Heaton born 
Anne Heche 1969–2022
Jessica Hecht born 
Eileen Heckart 1919–2001
Tippi Hedren born 
Katherine Heigl born 
Jayne Heitmeyer born  (born in Canada)
Marg Helgenberger born 
Katherine Helmond 1929–2019
Mariel Hemingway born 
Zulay Henao born  (born in Colombia)
Florence Henderson 1934–2016
Lauri Hendler born 
Christina Hendricks born  
Elaine Hendrix born 
Marilu Henner born 
Shelley Hennig born 
Linda Kaye Henning born 
Pamela Hensley born 
Taraji P. Henson born 
Natasha Henstridge born  (Canada)
Audrey Hepburn  1929–1993 (British)
Katharine Hepburn 1907–2003
Rebecca Herbst born 
Barbara Hershey born 
Lori Heuring born 
Jennifer Love Hewitt born 
Catherine Hicks born 
Brianna Hildebrand born 
Marianna Hill born  or 1941
Paris Hilton born  
Nichole Hiltz born 
Cheryl Hines born 
Connie Hines 1931–2009
Marin Hinkle born  (born in Tanzania)
Ashley Hinshaw born 
Judith Hoag born 
Mitzi Hoag 1932–2019
Gaby Hoffmann born 
Brooke Hogan born 
Alexandra Holden born 
Laurie Holden born 
Willa Holland born 
Judy Holliday 1921–1965
Polly Holliday born 
Laurel Holloman born  or 1971
Lauren Holly born 
Celeste Holm 1917–2012
Katie Holmes born 
Darla Hood 1931–1979
Charlene Holt 1928–1996
Miriam Hopkins 1902–1972
Hedda Hopper 1885–1966
Cody Horn born 
Lena Horne 1917–2010
Julianne Hough born 
Whitney Houston 1963–2012
Bryce Dallas Howard born 
Traylor Howard born 
Beth Howland 1939–2015
Kelly Hu born 
Season Hubley born 
Vanessa Hudgens born 
Jennifer Hudson born 
Haley Hudson born 
Kate Hudson born 
Rochelle Hudson 1916–1972
Felicity Huffman born 
Sharon Hugueny 1944–1996
Josephine Hull 1877–1957
Gayle Hunnicutt born 
Bonnie Hunt born 
Helen Hunt born 
Linda Hunt born 
Marsha Hunt 1917-2022
Holly Hunter born 
Kaki Hunter born 
Kim Hunter 1922–2002
Mary Beth Hurt born 
Ruth Hussey 1911–2005
Anjelica Huston born 
Gunilla Hutton born  (Swedish-born)
Lauren Hutton born 
Martha Hyer 1924–2014
Sarah Hyland born 
Joyce Hyser born

I 

Laura Innes born 
Kathy Ireland born 
Marin Ireland born  Or 1980
Amy Irving born 
Judith Ivey born

J 

Janet Jackson born 
Kate Jackson born 
Shar Jackson born 
Sherry Jackson born 
Skai Jackson born 
Victoria Jackson born 
Allison Janney born 
Anne Jeffreys 1923–2017
Claudia Jennings 1949–1979
Scarlett Johansson born 
Amy Jo Johnson born 
Anne-Marie Johnson born 
Ashley Johnson born 
Dakota Johnson born 
Rita Johnson 1913–1965
Kristen Johnston born 
Lynn-Holly Johnson born 
Sandy Johnson born 
JoJo born 
Angelina Jolie born 
Anissa Jones 1958–1976
Carolyn Jones 1930–1983
Cherry Jones born 
Janet Jones born 
January Jones born 
Jasmine Cephas Jones born 
Jennifer Jones 1919–2009
Jill Marie Jones born 
Marcia Mae Jones 1924–2007
Rashida Jones born 
Renée Jones born 
Shirley Jones born 
Tamala Jones born 
Dorothy Jordan 1906–1988
Jackie Joseph born  (or 1933)
Milla Jovovich born 
Leatrice Joy 1893–1985
Elaine Joyce born 
Ella Joyce born 
Ashley Judd born 
Victoria Justice born

K 

Jane Kaczmarek born 
Madeline Kahn 1942–1999
Bianca Kajlich born 
Mindy Kaling born 
Elena Kampouris born 
Melina Kanakaredes born 
Carol Kane born 
Chelsea Kane born 
Mitzi Kapture born 
Kathryn Kates 1948–2022
Julie Kavner born 
Lainie Kazan born 
Jane Kean 1923–2013
Staci Keanan born 
Diane Keaton born 
Arielle Kebbel born 
Monica Keena born 
Catherine Keener born 
Sally Kellerman 1937-2022
Sheila Kelley born  or 1963, 1964, 1966
Catherine Kellner born 
Grace Kelly 1929–1982
Jean Louisa Kelly born 
Lisa Robin Kelly 1970–2013
Minka Kelly born 
Moira Kelly born 
Nancy Kelly 1921–1995
Patsy Kelly 1910–1981
Paula Kelly 1943–2020
Anna Kendrick born 
Barbara Kent 1907–2011
Riley Keough born 
Joanna Kerns born 
Sandra Kerns born 
Alicia Keys born 
Margot Kidder 1948–2018
Nicole Kidman born  
Laura Kightlinger born  or 1969
Adrienne King born  or 1960
Jaime King born 
Kent King born 
Joey King born 
Regina King born 
Phyllis Kirk 1927–2006
Lola Kirke born  (English-born)
Sally Kirkland born 
Tawny Kitaen 1961–2021
Eartha Kitt 1927–2008
Hayley Kiyoko born 
Alexis Knapp born 
Karen Kopins born 
Gladys Knight born 
Shirley Knight 1936–2020
Keisha Knight-Pulliam born 
Beyoncé Knowles born 
Solange Knowles born 
Susan Kohner born 
Karen Kopins born 
Nancy Kovack born 
Linda Kozlowski born 
Jane Krakowski born 
Clare Kramer born 
Louisa Krause born 
Zoë Kravitz born 
Lisa Kudrow born 
Mila Kunis born 
Swoosie Kurtz born 
Nancy Kwan born  (born in Hong Kong)

L 

Eva LaRue born 
Vanessa Lachey born 
Cheryl Ladd born 
Diane Ladd born 
Christine Lahti born 
Sanoe Lake born  or 1979
Ricki Lake born 
Veronica Lake 1922–1973
Christine Lakin born 
Hedy Lamarr 1914–2000 (born in Austria)
Dorothy Lamour 1914–1996
Sarah Lancaster born 
Juliet Landau born 
Ricki Noel Lander 1980
Audrey Landers born 
Judy Landers born 
Carole Landis 1919–1948
June Lang 1917–2005
Diane Lane born 
Priscilla Lane 1915–1995
Sasha Lane born 
Hope Lange 1933–2003
Jessica Lange born 
Heather Langenkamp born 
A. J. Langer born 
Brooke Langton born 
Angela Lansbury 1925-2022 (British-born)
Joi Lansing 1929–1972
Liza Lapira born 
Brie Larson born 
Ali Larter born 
Louise Lasser born 
Louise Latham 1922–2018
Sanaa Lathan born 
Queen Latifah born 
Ashley Laurence born 
Oona Laurence born 
Piper Laurie born 
Linda Lavin born 
Barbara Lawrence 1930–2013
Jennifer Lawrence born 
Vicki Lawrence born 
Bianca Lawson born 
Jayme Lawson born 
Maggie Lawson born 
Nicole Leach born 
Cloris Leachman 1926–2021
Sharon Leal born 
Michael Learned born 
Kelly Le Brock born 
Gwen Lee 1904–1961
Gypsy Rose Lee 1911-1970
Michele Lee born 
Peggy Lee 1920–2002
Robinne Lee born 
Sheryl Lee born 
Cassandra Lee Morris born 
Andrea Leeds 1914–1984
Erica Leerhsen born 
Hudson Leick born 
Cherami Leigh 
Chyler Leigh born 
Janet Leigh 1927–2004
Katie Leigh born 
Jennifer Jason Leigh born 
Bethany Joy Lenz born 
Kay Lenz born 
Melissa Leo born 
Téa Leoni born 
Joan Leslie 1925–2015
Margarita Levieva born  (born in Russia)
Jenifer Lewis born 
Juliette Lewis born 
Vicki Lewis born 
Liana Liberato born 
Jennifer Lien born 
Judith Light born 
Morgan Lily born 
Sophia Lillis born 
Abbey Lincoln 1930–2010
Riki Lindhome born 
Margaret Lindsay 1910–1981
Bai Ling born  (Chinese-born)
Laura Linney born 
Peggy Lipton 1946–2019
Peyton List born 
Peyton List born 
Zoe Lister-Jones born 
Lucy Liu born 
Blake Lively born 
Sabrina Lloyd born 
Amy Locane born 
Sondra Locke 1944–2018
Tammy Locke born 
Tembi Locke born 
Anne Lockhart born 
June Lockhart born 
Heather Locklear born 
Lindsay Lohan born 
Alison Lohman born 
Kristanna Loken born 
Carole Lombard 1908–1942
Karina Lombard born  
Julie London 1926–2000
Lauren London born 
Nia Long born 
Shelley Long born 
Eva Longoria born 
Jennifer Lopez born 
Traci Lords born 
Josie Loren born 
Joan Lorring 1926–2014
Caity Lotz born 
Lori Loughlin born 
Julia Louis-Dreyfus born 
Anita Louise 1915–1970
Tina Louise born 
Billie Lourd born 
Bessie Love 1898–1986
Courtney Love born 
Carey Lowell born 
Myrna Loy 1905–1993
Olivia Luccardi born 
Shannon Lucio born 
Lorna Luft born 
Deanna Lund 1937–2018
Jamie Luner born 
Ida Lupino 1918–1995 (English-born)
Patti LuPone born 
Masiela Lusha born  (Albanian-born)
Dorothy Lyman born 
Jane Lynch born 
Kelly Lynch born 
Carol Lynley 1942–2019
Meredith Scott Lynn born 
Sue Lyon 1946–2019
Natasha Lyonne born

M 

Jes Macallan born 
June MacCloy 1909–2005
Andie MacDowell born 
Ali MacGraw born 
Justina Machado born 
Allison Mack July 29, 1982 (born in Germany)
Dorothy Mackaill 1903–1990
 Joyce MacKenzie 1925–2021
Shirley MacLaine born 
Aline MacMahon 1899–1991
Meredith MacRae 1944–2000
Amy Madigan born 
Bailee Madison born 
Madonna born 
Virginia Madsen born 
Marjorie Main 1890–1975
Tina Majorino born 
Wendy Makkena born 
Wendie Malick born 
Dorothy Malone 1925–2018
Jena Malone born 
Camryn Manheim born 
Leslie Mann born 
Taryn Manning born 
Dinah Manoff born 
Jayne Mansfield 1933–1967
Gia Mantegna born 
Linda Manz 1961-2020
Adele Mara 1923–2010
Kate Mara born 
Rooney Mara born 
Laura Marano born 
Vanessa Marano born 
Jamie Marchi born 
Vanessa Marcil born 
Janet Margolin 1943–1993
Ann-Margret born 
Julianna Margulies born 
Constance Marie born 
Rose Marie 1923–2017
Jodie Markell born 
Meghan Markle born 
Brit Marling born  Or 1983
Paula Marshall born 
Penny Marshall 1943–2018
Andrea Martin born 
Kellie Martin born 
Mary Martin 1913–1990
Meaghan Jette Martin born 
Pamela Sue Martin born 
Margo Martindale born 
Natalie Martinez born 
Marsha Mason born 
Chase Masterson born 
Mary Stuart Masterson born 
Mary Elizabeth Mastrantonio born 
Samantha Mathis born 
Marlee Matlin born 
Marilyn Maxwell 1921–1972
Elaine May born 
Virginia Mayo 1920–2005
Melanie Mayron born 
Jayma Mays born 
Tristin Mays born 
Debi Mazar born 
Heather Mazur born 
Monet Mazur born 
May McAvoy 1899–1984
Diane McBain born 
Mitzi McCall born 
Irish McCalla 1928–2002
Mercedes McCambridge 1916–2004
Christine Elise McCarthy born 
Jenny McCarthy born 
Melissa McCarthy born 
Cady McClain born 
China Anne McClain born 
Sierra McClain born 
Rue McClanahan 1934–2010
Edie McClurg born 
AnnaLynne McCord born 
Mary McCormack born 
Patty McCormack born 
Maureen McCormick born 
Sierra McCormick born 
LisaRaye McCoy born 
Kimberly McCullough born 
Jennette McCurdy born 
Hattie McDaniel 1895–1952
Heather McDonald born 
Mary McDonnell born 
Frances McDormand born 
Reba McEntire born 
Gates McFadden born 
Vonetta McGee 1945–2010
Kelly McGillis born 
Elizabeth McGovern born 
Maureen McGovern born 
Rose McGowan born  
Melinda McGraw born 
Dorothy McGuire 1916–2001
Kathryn McGuire 1903–1978
Maeve McGuire born 
Lonette McKee born  or 1955
Danica McKellar born 
Nancy McKeon born 
Nina Mae McKinney 1912–1967
Wendi McLendon-Covey born 
Katherine McNamara born 
Maggie McNamara 1928–1978
Kristy McNichol born 
Katharine McPhee born 
Butterfly McQueen 1911–1995
Caroline McWilliams 1945–2010
Meredith MacRae 1944–2000
Eve McVeagh 1919–1997
Emily Meade born 
Anne Meara 1929–2015
Kay Medford 1914–1980
Leighton Meester born 
Tamara Mello born 
Eva Mendes born 
Erica Mendez 
Bridgit Mendler born 
Maria Menounos born 
Idina Menzel born 
Lee Meriwether born 
Una Merkel 1903–1986
Ethel Merman 1908–1984
Theresa Merritt 1922–1998
Debra Messing born 
Dina Meyer born 
AJ Michalka born 
Aly Michalka born 
Lea Michele born 
Bette Midler born 
Alyssa Milano born 
Sylvia Miles 1924–2019
Vera Miles born 
Christina Milian born 
Cristin Milioti born 
Penelope Milford born 
Ivana Miličević born  (born in Yugoslavia)
Ann Miller 1923–2004
Christa Miller born 
Lara Jill Miller born 
Penelope Ann Miller born 
Alley Mills born 
Donna Mills born 
Yvette Mimieux 1942-2022
Nicki Minaj born 
Rachel Miner born 
Ming-Na born  (born in Macau)
Liza Minnelli born 
Kelly Jo Minter born 
Beverley Mitchell born 
Elizabeth Mitchell born 
Katy Mixon born 
Mary Ann Mobley 1937–2014
Katherine Moennig born 
Gretchen Mol born 
Taylor Momsen born 
Michelle Monaghan born 
Isabela Moner born 
Daniella Monet born 
Mo'Nique born 
Maika Monroe born 
Marilyn Monroe 1926–1962
Meredith Monroe born  or 1968
Elizabeth Montgomery 1933–1995
Demi Moore born 
Grace Moore 1898–1947
Joanna Moore 1934–1997
Juanita Moore 1914–2014
Julianne Moore born 
Kenya Moore born 
Mandy Moore born 
Mary Tyler Moore 1936–2017
Terry Moore born 
Agnes Moorehead 1900–1974
Natalie Moorhead 1901–1992
Dolores Moran 1926–1982
Erin Moran 1960–2017
Peggy Moran 1918–2002
Belita Moreno born 
Rita Moreno born 
Chloë Grace Moretz born 
Cathy Moriarty born 
Debbi Morgan born 
Haviland Morris born 
Kathryn Morris born 
Jennifer Morrison born 
Shelley Morrison 1936–2019
Elisabeth Moss born 
Tamera Mowry born  (born in Germany)
Tia Mowry born  (born in Germany)
Bridget Moynahan born  or 1970
Annie Mumolo born 
Liliana Mumy born 
Diana Muldaur born 
Kate Mulgrew born 
Megan Mullally born 
Olivia Munn born 
Brittany Murphy 1977–2009
Donna Murphy born 
Rosemary Murphy 1925–2014
Jillian Murray born

N 

Kathy Najimy born 
Nita Naldi 1894–1961
Florence Nash 1888–1950
Mildred Natwick 1905–1994
Elise Neal born  or 1970
Patricia Neal 1926–2010
Noel Neill 1920–2016
Brooklyn Nelson born 
Kristin Nelson 1945–2018
Novella Nelson 1938–2017
Tracy Nelson born 
Lois Nettleton 1927–2008
Bebe Neuwirth born 
Julie Newmar born 
Kathryn Newton born 
Barbara Nichols 1928–1976
Nichelle Nichols 1932–2022
Rachel Nichols born 
Julianne Nicholson born 
Lorraine Nicholson born 
Cynthia Nixon born 
Stephanie Niznik 1967–2019 
Maidie Norman 1912–1998
Mabel Normand 1892–1930
Sheree North 1932–2005
Brandy Norwood born 
Kim Novak born

O 

Margaret O'Brien born 
Erin O'Brien-Moore 1902–1979
Renee O'Connor born 
Rosie O'Donnell born 
Brittany O'Grady born 
Gail O'Grady born 
Catherine O'Hara born 
Maureen O'Hara 1920–2015 (Irish)
Jodi Lyn O'Keefe born 
Tricia O'Kelley born 
Tatum O'Neal born 
Barbara O'Neil 1910–1980
Jennifer O'Neill born  (born in Brazil)
Ahna O'Reilly born 
Maureen O'Sullivan 1911–1998
Annette O'Toole born 
Randi Oakes born 
Jacqueline Obradors born 
Larisa Oleynik born 
Susan Oliver 1932–1990
Ashley Olsen born 
Elizabeth Olsen born 
Mary-Kate Olsen born 
Susan Olsen born 
Nancy Olson born 
Olivia Olson born 
Renee Olstead born 
Lupe Ontiveros 1942–2012
Ana Ortiz born 
Emily Osment born 
Beth Ostrosky born 
Cheri Oteri born 
Park Overall born 
Kelly Overton born

P 

Judy Pace born 
Genevieve Padalecki born 
Anita Page 1910–2008
Geraldine Page 1924–1987
Janis Paige born 
Brina Palencia born 
Adrianne Palicki born 
Betsy Palmer 1926–2015
Keke Palmer born 
Gwyneth Paltrow born 
Kay Panabaker born 
Danielle Panabaker born 
Hayden Panettiere born 
Annie Parisse born 
Grace Park born  (Canadian-American)
Linda Park born 
Eleanor Parker 1922–2013
Lara Parker born  or 1937
Mary-Louise Parker born 
Nicole Ari Parker born 
Sarah Jessica Parker born 
Suzy Parker 1932–2003
Lana Parrilla born 
Janel Parrish born 
Leslie Parrish born 
Estelle Parsons born 
Karyn Parsons born 
Dolly Parton born 
Tonye Patano born 
Luana Patten 1938–1996
Elizabeth Patterson 1874–1966
Marnette Patterson born 
Neva Patterson 1920–2010
Paula Patton born 
Alexandra Paul born 
Sarah Paulson born 
Sara Paxton born 
Alice Pearce 1917–1966
Patricia Pearcy born 
Nia Peeples born 
Amanda Peet born 
Mary Beth Peil born 
Elizabeth Peña 1959–2014
Piper Perabo born 
Rosie Perez born 
Elizabeth Perkins born 
Millie Perkins born 
Rhea Perlman born 
Pauley Perrette born 
Valerie Perrine born 
Barbara Perry 1921–2019
Donna Pescow born 
Bernadette Peters born 
Jean Peters 1926–2000
Susan Peters 1921–1952
Amanda Peterson 1971–2015
Cassandra Peterson born 
Valarie Pettiford born 
Madison Pettis born 
Lori Petty born 
Jade Pettyjohn born 
Dedee Pfeiffer born 
Michelle Pfeiffer born 
Jo Ann Pflug born 
Mary Philbin 1902–1993
Busy Philipps born 
Gina Philips born 
Bijou Phillips born 
Mackenzie Phillips born 
Michelle Phillips born 
Cindy Pickett born 
Mary Pickford 1892–1979 
Christina Pickles born 
Molly Picon 1898–1992
Julie Piekarski born 
Sasha Pieterse  born  (born South African)
Jada Pinkett Smith born 
Leah Pipes born 
Maria Pitillo born  or 1966
Zasu Pitts 1894–1963
Mary Kay Place born 
Dana Plato 1964–1999
Alice Playten 1947–2011
Aubrey Plaza born 
Suzanne Pleshette 1937–2008
Martha Plimpton born 
Eve Plumb born 
Amy Poehler born 
Priscilla Pointer born 
Sydney Tamiia Poitier born 
Teri Polo born 
Scarlett Pomers born 
Ellen Pompeo born 
Alisan Porter born 
Natalie Portman born 
Parker Posey born 
Laura Post born 
Markie Post 1950–2021
Monica Potter born 
Annie Potts born 
CCH Pounder born  (Guyana-born)
Phyllis Povah 1893–1975
Eleanor Powell 1912–1982
Jane Powell 1929-2021
Stefanie Powers born 
Keri Lynn Pratt born 
Kyla Pratt born 
Laura Prepon born 
Paula Prentiss born 
Jaime Pressly born 
Carrie Preston born 
Kelly Preston 1962–2020
Lindsay Price born 
Megyn Price born 
Pat Priest born 
Victoria Principal born 
Emily Procter born 
Dorothy Provine 1935–2010
Florence Pugh born 
Linda Purl born 
Missi Pyle born

Q 

Maggie Q born 
Margaret Qualley born 
Rainey Qualley born 
Kathleen Quinlan born 
Maeve Quinlan born 
Aileen Quinn born 
Molly Quinn born 
Pat Quinn born 
Beulah Quo 1923–2002
Audrey Quock born

R 

Cassidy Rae born 
Charlotte Rae 1926–2018
Cristina Raines born 
Ella Raines 1920–1988
Francia Raisa born 
Mary Lynn Rajskub born 
Sheryl Lee Ralph born 
Esther Ralston 1902–1994
Marjorie Rambeau 1889–1970
Leven Rambin born 
Cierra Ramirez born 
Dania Ramirez born  (Dominican-born)
Sara Ramirez born  (Mexican-born)
Anne Ramsey 1929–1988
Laura Ramsey born 
Marion Ramsey 1947-2021
Theresa Randle born 
Jane Randolph 1914-2009
June Diane Raphael born 
Phylicia Rashad born 
Emily Ratajkowski born 
Kim Raver born 
Navi Rawat born 
Martha Raye 1916–1994
Tania Raymonde born 
Nancy Davis Reagan 1921–2016
Elizabeth Reaser born 
Alyson Reed born 
Crystal Reed born 
Donna Reed 1921–1986
Nikki Reed born 
Pamela Reed born 
Della Reese 1931–2017
Autumn Reeser born 
Bridget Regan born 
Storm Reid born 
Tara Reid born 
Lee Remick 1935–1991
Leah Remini born 
Retta born 
Anne Revere 1903–1990
Judy Reyes born 
Debbie Reynolds 1932–2016
Alicia Rhett 1915–2014
Barbara Rhoades born  or 1947
Cynthia Rhodes born 
Jennifer Rhodes born 
Kim Rhodes born 
Monica Rial born 
Marissa Ribisi born 
Elizabeth Rice born 
Gigi Rice born 
Christina Ricci born 
Ariana Richards born 
Beah Richards 1920–2000
Denise Richards born 
Kim Richards born 
Kyle Richards born 
Cameron Richardson born 
LaTanya Richardson born 
Natasha Richardson 1963–2009 (British-American)
Patricia Richardson born 
Ashley Rickards born 
Beth Riesgraf born 
Amanda Righetti born 
Jeannine Riley born 
LeAnn Rimes born 
Molly Ringwald born 
Lisa Rinna born 
Kelly Ripa born 
Krysten Ritter born 
Thelma Ritter 1902–1969
Naya Rivera 1987–2020
AnnaSophia Robb born 
Doris Roberts 1925–2016
Emma Roberts born 
Julia Roberts born 
Tanya Roberts 1955–2021
Britt Robertson born 
Robey born  (Canadian-American born)
Wendy Robie born 
Wendy Raquel Robinson born 
Ann Robinson born 
Cindy Robinson born 
Holly Robinson-Peete born 
Lela Rochon born 
Holland Roden born 
Gina Rodriguez born 
Michelle Rodriguez born 
Raini Rodriguez born 
Sarah Roemer born 
Ginger Rogers 1911–1995
Mimi Rogers born 
Elisabeth Röhm born 
Esther Rolle 1920–1998
Rose Rollins born  or 1978
Ruth Roman 1922–1999
Christy Carlson Romano born 
Rebecca Romijn born 
Xosha Roquemore born 
Anika Noni Rose born 
Cristine Rose born 
Emily Rose born 
Margot Rose born 
Diana Ross born 
Katharine Ross born 
Tracee Ellis Ross born 
Emmy Rossum born 
Lillian Roth 1910–1980
Jessica Rothe born 
Misty Rowe born  or 1950
Victoria Rowell born 
Kelly Rowland born 
Gena Rowlands born 
Jennifer Rubin born 
Zelda Rubinstein 1933–2010
Maya Rudolph born 
Cher Rue born 
Sara Rue born 
Mercedes Ruehl born 
Janice Rule 1931–2003
Olesya Rulin born  (born in Russia)
Jennifer Runyon born 
Debra Jo Rupp born 
Barbara Rush born 
Odeya Rush born  (Israeli-born)
Betsy Russell born 
Gail Russell 1924–1961
Jane Russell 1921–2011
Keri Russell born 
Rosalind Russell 1907–1976
Theresa Russell born 
Deanna Russo born 
Rene Russo born 
Kelly Rutherford born 
Amy Ryan born 
Blanchard Ryan born 
Debby Ryan born 
Eileen Ryan born 
Irene Ryan 1902–1973
Jeri Ryan born 
Meg Ryan born 
Winona Ryder born

S 

Katee Sackhoff born 
Katey Sagal born 
Halston Sage born 
Eva Marie Saint born 
Susan Saint James born 
Jill St. John born 
Zoe Saldana born 
Laura San Giacomo born 
Kiele Sanchez born 
Erin Sanders born 
Jackie Sandler born 
Bianca Santos born 
Mia Sara born 
Susan Sarandon born 
Tura Satana 1938–2011
Lori Saunders born 
Morgan Saylor born 
Allison Scagliotti born 
Gia Scala 1934–1972 (English-born)
Diana Scarwid born 
Cassie Scerbo born 
Kristen Schaal born 
Wendy Schaal born 
Felice Schachter born 
Rebecca Schaeffer 1967–1989
Natalie Schafer 1900–1991
Anne Schedeen born 
Taylor Schilling born 
Carly Schroeder born 
Rebecca Schull born 
Amy Schumer born 
Annabella Sciorra born 
Ashley Scott born 
Jill Scott born 
Lizabeth Scott 1922–2015
Martha Scott 1912–2003
Stefanie Scott born 
Amy Sedaris born 
Kyra Sedgwick born 
Sandra Seacat born 
Marian Seldes 1928–2014
Christian Serratos born 
Joan Severance born 
Chloë Sevigny born 
Amanda Seyfried born 
Anne Seymour 1909–1988
Jane Seymour born 
Sarah Shahi born 
Yara Shahidi born 
Molly Shannon born 
Karen Sharpe born 
Lindsey Shaw born 
Vinessa Shaw born 
Alia Shawkat born 
Lin Shaye born 
Norma Shearer 1920–1983 (Canadian-American)
Ally Sheedy born 
Kate Lyn Sheil born 1985
Adrienne Shelly 1966–2006
Marley Shelton born 
Cybill Shepherd born 
Sherri Shepherd born 
Ann Sheridan 1915–1967
Lisa Sheridan 1974–2019
Margaret Sheridan 1926–1982
Nicollette Sheridan born  (British-born)
Brooke Shields born 
Alexandra Shipp born 
Talia Shire born 
Anne Shirley 1918–1993
Dinah Shore 1916–1994
Elisabeth Shue born 
Jane Sibbett born 
Gabourey Sidibe born 
Sylvia Sidney 1910–1999
Drew Sidora born 
Maggie Siff born 
Jamie-Lynn Sigler born 
Karen Sillas born 
Leslie Silva born 
Sarah Silverman born 
Alicia Silverstone born 
Jessica Simpson born 
Molly Sims born 
Nancy Sinatra born 
Jaz Sinclair born 
Lori Singer born 
Marina Sirtis born 
Jennifer Sky born 
Azura Skye born 
Ione Skye born 
Jenny Slate born 
Helen Slater born 
Lindsay Sloane born 
Amy Smart born 
Jean Smart born 
Amber Smith born 
Anna Nicole Smith 1967–2007
Brooke Smith born 
Jaclyn Smith born 
Kellita Smith born 
Lois Smith born 
Madolyn Smith born 
Martha Smith born 
Shawnee Smith born  or 1970
Shelley Smith born 
Tasha Smith born 
Willow Smith born 
Yeardley Smith born 
Jan Smithers born 
Carrie Snodgress 1945–2004
Brittany Snow born 
Liza Snyder born 
Leelee Sobieski born  or 1982
Rena Sofer born 
Marla Sokoloff born 
Sarah Sokolovic born 
P. J. Soles born 
Suzanne Somers born 
Bonnie Somerville born 
Phyllis Somerville 1943–2020
Gale Sondergaard 1899–1985
Brenda Song born 
Mira Sorvino born 
Shannyn Sossamon born 
Ann Sothern 1909–2001
Sissy Spacek born 
Jordin Sparks born 
Britney Spears born 
Jamie Lynn Spears born 
Tori Spelling born 
Abigail Spencer born 
Danielle Spencer born 
Octavia Spencer born  or 1970
Ashley Spillers born 
June Squibb born 
Gina St. John
Kelly Stables born 
Florence Stanley 1924–2003
Kim Stanley 1925–2001
Barbara Stanwyck 1907–1990
Jean Stapleton 1923–2013
Maureen Stapleton 1925–2006
Karen Steele 1931–1988
Mary Steenburgen born 
Leslie Stefanson born 
Hailee Steinfeld born 
Amandla Stenberg born 
Jan Sterling 1921–2004
Mindy Sterling born 
Frances Sternhagen born 
Amber Stevens born 
Connie Stevens born 
Kaye Stevens 1932–2011
Stella Stevens born 
Elaine Stewart 1930–2011
Kristen Stewart born 
Julia Stiles born 
Emma Stone born 
Jennifer Stone born 
Sharon Stone born 
Alyson Stoner born 
Gale Storm 1922–2009
Madeleine Stowe born 
Beatrice Straight 1914–2001
Susan Strasberg 1938–1999
Meryl Streep born 
Barbra Streisand born 
Cecily Strong born 
Brenda Strong born 
Jessica Stroup born 
Sally Struthers born 
Barbara Stuart 1930–2011
Jean Stuart 1906–1926 Silent films
Gloria Stuart 1910–2010
Margaret Sullavan 1909–1960
Kelly Sullivan born 
Kristine Sutherland born 
Carol Sutton 1944–2020
Mena Suvari born 
Dominique Swain born 
Hilary Swank born 
Gloria Swanson 1899–1983
Kristy Swanson born 
Julia Sweeney born 
Jodie Sweetin born 
Taylor Swift born 
Amanda Swisten born 
Loretta Swit born 
Wanda Sykes born 
Raven-Symoné born

T 

Sophia Takal
Nita Talbot born 
Patricia Tallman born 
Constance Talmadge 1898–1973
Natalie Talmadge 1896–1969
Norma Talmadge 1894–1957
Amber Tamblyn born 
Jessica Tandy 1909–1994 
Katelyn Tarver born 
Lilyan Tashman 1896–1934
Sharon Tate 1943–1969
Christine Taylor born 
Elizabeth Taylor 1932–2011
Holland Taylor born 
Jennifer Taylor born 
Leigh Taylor-Young born 1945
Lili Taylor born 
Scout Taylor-Compton born 
Tamara Taylor born  (Canadian-American born)
Aimee Teegarden born 
Shirley Temple 1928–2014
Tia Texada born 
Maria Thayer born 
Charlize Theron born  (South African-born)
Tiffany Thiessen born 
Lynne Thigpen 1948–2003
Olivia Thirlby born 
Marlo Thomas born 
Lea Thompson born 
Susanna Thompson born 
Tessa Thompson born 
Bella Thorne born 
Callie Thorne born 
Courtney Thorne-Smith born 
Uma Thurman born 
Gene Tierney 1920–1991
Maura Tierney born 
Pamela Tiffin born 
Jennifer Tilly born 
Meg Tilly born 
Addison Timlin born 
Lio Tipton born 
Ashley Tisdale born 
Hallie Todd born 
Thelma Todd 1906–1935
Lauren Tom born 
Nicholle Tom born 
Marisa Tomei born 
Tamlyn Tomita born 
Lily Tomlin born 
Gina Torres born 
Audrey Totter 1917–2013
Constance Towers born 
Michelle Trachtenberg born 
Thalia Tran
Nancy Travis born 
Claire Trevor 1910–2000
Jeanne Tripplehorn born 
Dorothy Tristan 1934–2023
Rachel True born 
Jessica Tuck born 
Robin Tunney born 
Paige Turco born 
Bree Turner born 
Janine Turner born 
Kathleen Turner born 
Lana Turner 1921–1995
Tina Turner born 
Helen Twelvetrees 1908–1958
Aisha Tyler born 
Liv Tyler born 
Susan Tyrrell 1945–2012
Cicely Tyson 1924–2021

U 

Alanna Ubach born 
Leslie Uggams born 
Tracey Ullman born 
Kim Johnston Ulrich born 
Carrie Underwood born 
Sara Jean Underwood born 
Sheryl Underwood born 
Gabrielle Union born 
Kate Upton born 
Jenna Ushkowitz born  (Korean-born)

V 

Brenda Vaccaro born 
Cristina Valenzuela born 
Sigrid Valdis 1935–2007
Nancy Valen born 
Brooke Valentine born 
Cindy Valentine born 
Karen Valentine born 
Amber Valletta born 
Joan Van Ark born 
Mamie Van Doren born 
Hilary Van Dyke born 
Grace Van Patten born 
Joyce Van Patten born 
Deborah Van Valkenburgh born 
Monique Van Vooren 1927–2020 (born in Belgium)
Jo Van Fleet 1914–1996
Danitra Vance 1954–1994
Vivian Vance 1909–1979
Shantel VanSanten born 
Janet Varney born 
Diane Varsi 1938–1992
Liz Vassey born 
Sofia Vassilieva born 
Countess Vaughn born 
Terri J. Vaughn born 
Alexa Vega born 
Makenzie Vega born 
Jaci Velasquez born 
Nadine Velazquez born 
Lauren Vélez born 
Diane Venora born 
Cassie Ventura born 
Gwen Verdon 1925–2000
Elena Verdugo 1925–2017
Sofia Vergara born  (born in Colombia)
Kate Vernon born  (born in Canada)
Victoria Vetri born 
Yvette Vickers 1928–2010
Christina Vidal born 
Lisa Vidal born 
Tracy Vilar born 
Nana Visitor born 
Jenna von Oÿ born 
Lark Voorhies born 
Gloria Votsis born

W 

Caitlin Wachs born 
Lindsay Wagner born 
Natasha Gregson Wagner born 
Janet Waldo 1920–2016
Shawna Waldron born 
Abby Walker born 
Ally Walker born 
Arnetia Walker born 
Bree Walker born 
Dreama Walker born 
Kathryn Walker born 
Nancy Walker 1922–1992
Dee Wallace born 
Marcia Wallace 1942–2013
Quvenzhané Wallis born 
Kate Walsh born 
Maiara Walsh born 
Jessica Walter 1941–2021
Lisa Ann Walter born 
Laurie Walters born 
Melora Walters born  or 1968, or 1959
Nancy Walters 1933–2009
Susan Walters born 
Peggy Walton-Walker born  or 1948
Zoë Wanamaker born  
B. J. Ward born 
Maitland Ward born 
Megan Ward born 
Rachel Ward born  (British-American born)
Sela Ward born 
Susan Ward born 
Emily Warfield born 
Marlene Warfield born 
Marsha Warfield born 
Dawn Rochelle Warner born 
Julie Warner born 
Estella Warren born 
Jennifer Warren born 
Karle Warren born 
Kiersten Warren born 
Lesley Ann Warren born 
Ruth Warrick 1916–2005
Fredi Washington 1903–1994
Kerry Washington born 
Ethel Waters 1896–1977
Katherine Waterston born  (English-born)
Carlene Watkins born  
Michaela Watkins born 
Cynthia Watros born 
Vernee Watson-Johnson born 
Rolonda Watts born 
Kim Wayans born 
Carol Wayne 1942–1985
Shawn Weatherly born 
Sigourney Weaver born 
Bresha Webb born 
Chloe Webb born 
Haley Webb born 
Jane Webb 1925–2010
Veronica Webb born 
Ann Wedgeworth 1934–2017
Virginia Weidler 1927–1968
Liza Weil born 
Rachel Weisz born 
Raquel Welch born 
Savannah Welch born 
Tahnee Welch born 
Tuesday Weld born 
Gwen Welles 1951–1993
Rebecca Wells 1928–2017
Dawn Wells 1938–2020
Mae West 1893–1980
Celia Weston born 
Patricia Wettig born 
Dana Wheeler-Nicholson born 
Jill Whelan born 
Lisa Whelchel born 
Shannon Whirry born 
Betty White 1922–2021
Carole Ita White born 
Julie White born 
Karen Malina White born 
Michole Briana White born 
Persia White born 
Ruth White 1914–1969
Lynn Whitfield born 
Mae Whitman born 
Kym Whitley born 
Grace Lee Whitney 1930–2015
Mary Wickes 1910–1995
Dianne Wiest born 
Laura Slade Wiggins born 
Kristen Wiig born 
Collin Wilcox 1935–2009
Lisa Wilcox born 
Abby Wilde born 
Olivia Wilde born 
Samira Wiley born 
Kathleen Wilhoite born 
Adrienne Wilkinson born 
Allison Williams born 
Cara Williams born 
Cindy Williams born 
Esther Williams 1921–2013
JoBeth Williams born 
Kelli Williams born 
Kiely Williams born 
Kimberly Williams-Paisley born 
Kimberly Kevon Williams born 
Malinda Williams born 
Michelle Williams born 
Michelle Williams (singer) born 
Natashia Williams born 
Vanessa Williams born 
Vanessa Estelle Williams born 
Vesta Williams 1957–2011
Wendy Williams born 
Zelda Williams born 
Afton Williamson born 
Kate Williamson 1931–2013
Kenya D. Williamson born 
Alicia Leigh Willis born 
Katherine Willis born 
Rumer Willis born 
Beverly Wills 1933–1963
Bridgette Wilson born 
Casey Wilson born 
Chandra Wilson born 
Debra Wilson born 
Elizabeth Wilson 1921–2015
Kristen Wilson born 
Mara Wilson born 
Mary Louise Wilson born 
Rita Wilson born 
Sheree J. Wilson born 
Camille Winbush born 
Oprah Winfrey born 
Debra Winger born 
Mare Winningham born 
Mary Elizabeth Winstead born 
Ariel Winter born 
Shelley Winters 1920–2006
Jane Withers 1926–2021
Reese Witherspoon born 
Alicia Witt born 
Collette Wolfe born 
Fryda Wolff born 
Deborah Ann Woll born 
Evan Rachel Wood born 
Lana Wood born 
Natalie Wood 1938–1981
Alfre Woodard born 
Pat Woodell 1944–2015
Shailene Woodley born 
Joanne Woodward born 
Shannon Woodward born 
Fay Wray 1907–2004
N'Bushe Wright born 
Robin Wright born 
Teresa Wright 1918–2005
Kari Wuhrer born 
Jane Wyman 1917–2007
Jane Wyatt 1910–2006

Y 

Celeste Yarnall 1944–2018
Deborah Yates born 
Amy Yasbeck born 
Morgan York born 
Evelyn Young 1915–1983
Loretta Young 1913–2000
Sean Young born 
Barrie Youngfellow 1946–2022

Z 

Grace Zabriskie born 
Pia Zadora born  or 1954
Lisa Zane born 
Carmen Zapata 1927–2014
Natalie Zea born 
Nora Zehetner born 
Renée Zellweger born 
Zendaya born 
Madeline Zima born 
Vanessa Zima born 
Yvonne Zima born 
Stephanie Zimbalist born 
Constance Zimmer born 
Charlotte Zucker 1921–2007
Daphne Zuniga born 

See key to entries above.

See also 
 Lists of Americans

References

External links 
Most popular American actresses on Wikipedia, with user comments on traffic jumps

 
American actresses
Lists of actors by nationality
Actr
American film
American film-related lists